A Fractured Leghorn is a 1950 Warner Bros. Merrie Melodies cartoon directed by Robert McKimson. The cartoon was released on September 16, 1950, and features Foghorn Leghorn.

Foghorn is in pursuit of a snack of earthworm, but if he wants the worm he will have to outwit a cat. As usual, Foghorn is voiced by Mel Blanc, as is the cat.

That is one of few Foghorn cartoons where Leghorn is not put at odds with Henery Hawk and/or the Barnyard Dawg.

Plot
In the opening scene, the cat is shown fishing in the pond in Foghorn's resident farm. He is after a large, juicy, succulent, tender fish that lives in the pond and is clearly willing to go to any lengths to catch one. His feet are actually far into the water — an anomaly for domestic cats. Almost all of him that is in the water is covered in hooks. It can also be assumed that he has sat for long hours, as he becomes inconsolably excited when he feels a tug on one of his hooks. However, when he pulls it out of the water, it doesn't bear the object of his desire; rather, it's attached to a note reading "Dear Dope, You can't catch us Fish without a Worm on the hook. Signed, The Fish." (The note from the fish to the cat questions the mental capacity of the fish, as it says that, no matter what, they will take the bait.)

Frustrated, the cat begins now to find a way to catch a worm. Little does he know at first that one has popped out of the ground — intending to enjoy the sunshine — but the worm is soon in peril as Foghorn begins to chase him, intending to snack on him. But once it comes into the sights of the cat, it stops moving. Both Foghorn and the cat are running at him with all their speed — the cat with an empty tomato can. The worm uses the only method of escape available to it: a nearby stone chimney. Instead of the worm, the cat catches Foghorn's head in the can. Instead of the worm, Foghorn drives his beak into the ground near the cat; and both of them see stars. Then, once they both shake it off, Foghorn confronts the cat and demands to know what he was doing chasing "his" worm, pointing out that he does not go around chasing mice, and that that's a cat's job. The cat is a cat, Foghorn says, so he should make himself useful chasing down mice. (While saying this, he advances on the cat so forcefully that the latter falls backwards through the fence. Foghorn picks him up and tells him that he ought to learn to stand on his own feet.) He also threatens to start eating mice if the cat won't stop chasing worms. All the while, he does not allow the cat to get a word in edgewise (this was also the situation that Henery's father found himself in two years earlier in The Foghorn Leghorn). Again, Foghorn advances upon the cat, stating that "if you'd just quit arguin' and jawin', you'd see my side of it" and to not "keep that mouth flappin' and do no listening", at the same time as forcing him to back up a ladder. At the top, the cat falls down backwards. From the ladder, Foghorn states that "There's nothin' worse than a blabbermouth cat" (even though Foghorn is the one that is the blabbermouth).

However, the cat recovers enough in a short time to dress his finger up like a worm, using green and black paint. He also rigs a paintbrush to a wheel (the brush fresh with green paint), and contrives to set up a guillotine-like system (the purpose of which isn't to decapitate Foghorn, but rather to hold him in place by the head, as the "blade" is actually made of wood and has a large hole in it). The cat sticks his decoy out under the "guillotine" where he hopes Foghorn will go for it. He has very little time to wait, as Foghorn is employing a telescope to get the location of the actual worm before the cat, and he spots the fake worm. When he dives headfirst for it, the cat pulls the rope and Foghorn's head is trapped in place. The cat drags out his wheel; Foghorn asks him what he'll do with it. The cat silently answers by setting his wheel, with its load of green paint, in motion, and the brush repeatedly hits Foghorn in the face, painting him green from the neck up.

The cat now thinks he can look for the worm undeterred by the pesky Foghorn. He snatches an axe from a nearby stump and wields it haphazardly around, but Foghorn, having somehow just escaped, comes along and reprimands the cat, reminding him that he's not George Washington (not realizing that the cat was not about to cut down a cherry tree as the original President of the United States was said to have done in his youth). The cat sticks the axe into the fence again, but this time Foghorn doesn't pick him up and tell him to learn to stand up by himself. Very briefly, the cat is downcast, but this changes as the worm now passes to within three inches of his own nose. The worm is initially slow to realize his danger, but when he does, he is very speedy to move to a tractor nearby and hide in the exhaust pipe. Having no clue where the worm is exactly, the cat grabs a stick and quickly raps the tractor with it, intending to scare the worm out of hiding. Cautiously, the worm sticks his head out of the exhaust pipe, but the cat instantly dives for him. He misses, however, his mouth squarely holding the pipe. Foghorn comes by and starts the engine, leaving the cat sputtering out gas.

He chases the worm out to a nearby pair of tiny holes, very close together; the worm dives into one of them. The cat manages to guess which one on the first try, but when he sticks his toe into the hole, the worm chomps him hard. This, however, only cements the cat's desire for a fish dish. He tries to pounce on the worm several times, but misses each time. However, he does spot a bicycle pump near the "left" hole (from the viewpoint of the audience). He inserts the pump into this hole and begins vigorously pumping. He tries three times to catch the worm while he's in the air, but the lack of pressure on the pump handle allows the worm to fall right back into the hole. The cat plans to try a fourth time, but Foghorn comes by again — now assuming that the cat is after petroleum. Geology says the ground's all wrong. And even if there was crude oil|oil, you'd need a drill, not a tire pump!" The cat stumbles under a wagon full of hay and Foghorn picks him up and flatly tells him, with a note of sincerity that he hopes this will be the final time, to "stand on your own feet, son. I may not always be around to help ya." As an aside fourth wall to the audience, Foghorn remarks that the cat "has a mouth like a cannon, always shootin' it off". However, when he comes to the pipe, Foghorn can't resist pushing the handle. Much to his surprise and delight, the worm comes right out of the other hole. Foghorn snaps at him with his beak, but every time he misses, like the cat. But right when he has pushed the worm up on a vertical stream of air past his own head and lets go of the pump, the cat snatches the worm, leaving Foghorn infuriated with himself.

Now, or so he believes, guaranteed of a fish, the cat attaches the worm to his fishing rod. The worm seemingly dips one toe into the pond, shivers and scurries up the line. However, anticipating that his catch might try something like that, the cat forces the worm back down to the hook at gunpoint. Little does the overconfident cat realize that Foghorn saw the whole thing from behind a tree and somehow managed to travel from his vantage point to a point inside the pond in a fraction of a second, because the next thing he knows, Foghorn has snatched the worm and is demanding to know "What kept, I say, what kept you, son?" He goes on to say that the cat ought to have realized that he isn't a fish, and that his lungs would have long since begun to "crave air!" Muffled burbling is heard as the cat is forced to back up into the water trough nearby and Foghorn, having dipped his own head in, continues to berate his feline enemy, not missing a beat as both reemerge. Finally, Foghorn realizes that he has to appease the cat if he wants him to stop chasing the worm. So he offers to "draw a line and BI-SECT 'im." And this he does with a pen, a tree stump and an axe. Foghorn draws the line evenly, so that exactly half of the stump area is on one side and the other half on the other side, and places the worm perpendicular to the line. On the cat's side is just the head; Foghorn gets to keep all else of the worm. However, as Foghorn raises the axe to cut the worm in half, the object of both their desires scrunches up all on Foghorn's side. Foghorn states delightedly: "Well, barbecue my hamhocks. YOUR half is gone!" The cat tries to point out that the worm just pulled his head over to Foghorn's side, but Foghorn tells the cat, "Don't gimme no lip, son. You gotta stick by the bargain. I'd have done the same." But as they argue, the worm scrunches up all in the cat's end. Foghorn states in a state of shock: "Well, pig|hog gravy and chetlucks. MY half is gone!" Gleefully, but at the same time respectfully, the cat tries to say that the worm pulled all his parts below his head to his own side. However, Foghorn thinks that the cat wants to question whether or not the worm was there, and so Foghorn says, "I know what you're gonna say, son. When two halves is gone, there's nothin' left. And you're right. It's a little old worm who wasn't there. Two nothin's is nothing. That's mathematics, son. You can argue with ME, but you can't argue with figures. Two half-nothings is a whole nothin'. And I know what I'm talking about, because..." Foghorn does not get to finish his last sentence, as the cat, finally fed up with a chicken much larger than he is, doing exactly what he accused him of (talking incessantly), screams at the other worm-pursuer to shut up. While Foghorn and the cat are arguing again, the worm, having spotted a perfect opportunity to escape, crawls off.

Forgetting about the worm, Foghorn says to the audience: "OK, I'll shut up." He goes on to explain that he isn't one of those annoying people who "always just have to keep their mouths flapping" and that he was properly raised, including how every time his father told him to shut up, he'd shut right up and would not speak again until he was told he was allowed to. This long-winded reminiscence of his own childhood concludes. As the cartoon begin to iris-out, how one time he nearly starved to death. But right as the circle is the size of his own head, Foghorn pulls it apart and screams, "WOULDN'T TELL HIM I WAS HUNGRY!!!!!!!!" ("Him" being his father.) He pulls it closed again.

References

External links
 

1950 films
1950 short films
1950 comedy films
1950 animated films
1950s English-language films
1950s Warner Bros. animated short films
Merrie Melodies short films
Foghorn Leghorn films
Animated films about cats
Films about worms
Fictional rivalries
Animated films about fish
Films about fishing
Animated films set in the United States
Films set on farms
Films set in 1950
Films directed by Robert McKimson
Films scored by Carl Stalling
Warner Bros. Cartoons animated short films